Biggleswade was a county constituency in Bedfordshire which was represented in the House of Commons of the Parliament of the United Kingdom from 1885 until its abolition in 1918. It elected one Member of Parliament (MP) by the first-past-the-post voting system.

Boundaries

The constituency was created as the Northern or Biggleswade Division of Bedfordshire under the Redistribution of Seats Act 1885, when the two-member Parliamentary County of Bedfordshire was divided into the two single-member constituencies of Biggleswade and Luton. It comprised the sessional divisions of Bedford, Biggleswade and Sharnbrook, part of the sessional division of Ampthill and the municipal borough of Bedford. Only non-resident freeholders of the municipal borough (which comprised the Parliamentary Borough of Bedford) were entitled to vote.

The constituency was abolished in 1918. The northern part of the Division surrounding the Borough of Bedford, including Kempston, was included in the Bedford Division.  The southern part, including Ampthill and Biggleswade, was included in the new Mid Bedfordshire Division.

Members of Parliament

Elections

Elections in the 1880s

Elections in the 1890s

Elections in the 1900s

Elections in the 1910s

General Election 1914–15:

Another General Election was required to take place before the end of 1915. The political parties had been making preparations for an election to take place and by the July 1914, the following candidates had been selected; 
Liberal: Arthur Black
Unionist: Geoffrey Carr Glyn

See also
 List of former United Kingdom Parliament constituencies
 Parliamentary franchise in the United Kingdom 1885–1918

References

Parliamentary constituencies in Bedfordshire (historic)
Constituencies of the Parliament of the United Kingdom established in 1885
Constituencies of the Parliament of the United Kingdom disestablished in 1918
Biggleswade